The 17th Vanier Cup was played on November 28, 1981, at Varsity Stadium in Toronto, Ontario, and decided the CIAU football champion for the 1980 season. The Acadia Axemen won their second championship by defeating the defending champion Alberta Golden Bears by a score of 18-12.

References

External links
 Official website

Vanier Cup
Vanier Cup
Vanier Cup
Vanier Cup